Phyllonorycter montanella is a moth of the family Gracillariidae. It is known from Pakistan.

The larvae feed on Lonicera quinquelocularis. They mine the leaves of their host plant.

References

montanella
Moths of Asia
Moths described in 1980